This article lists the birds found in the Indian state of Tamil Nadu. 583 species of birds have been spotted in Tamil Nadu. The list also sometimes includes the local Tamil name in italics following the English common name. This list's taxonomic treatment (designation and sequence of orders, families and species) and nomenclature (common and scientific names) follow the conventions of the IOC World Bird List, version 11.2. This list also uses British English throughout.  Any bird names or other wording follows that convention.

The following tags have been used to highlight several categories. The commonly occurring native species do not fit within any of these categories.

(A) Accidental - Also known as a rarity, it refers to a species that rarely or accidentally occurs in Tamil Nadu - typically less than ten confirmed records.
(I) Introduced - a species introduced to Tamil Nadu as a consequence, direct or indirect, of human actions.

Ducks, geese, and swans

Order: AnseriformesFamily: Anatidae

Anatidae includes the ducks and most duck-like waterfowl, such as geese and swans. These birds are adapted to an aquatic existence with webbed feet, flattened bills, and feathers that are excellent at shedding water due to an oily coating.

Fulvous whistling duck, பெரிய சீழ்கை சிறகி (A)
Lesser whistling duck, சிறிய சீழ்கை சிறகி
Bar-headed goose, பட்டைத்தலை வாத்து 
Greylag goose
Knob-billed duck, செண்டு வாத்து
Ruddy shelduck, கருடதாரா (A)
Cotton pygmy goose, அல்லிச் சிறகி
Garganey, வெண்புருவ வாத்து (அ) நீலச்சிறகி
Northern shoveler, ஆண்டி வாத்து
Gadwall, கருவால் வாத்து (A)
Falcated duck
Eurasian wigeon, நாமத்தலை வாத்து 
Indian spot-billed duck, புள்ளி-மூக்கு வாத்து
Northern pintail, ஊசிவால் வாத்து
Eurasian teal, கிளுவை
Pink-headed duck இளஞ்சிவப்பு தலை வாத்து
Red-crested pochard
Common pochard
Ferruginous duck, வெள்ளைக்கண் களியன்
Tufted duck, குறுங்களியன்

Pheasants and allies

Order: GalliformesFamily: Phasianidae

The Phasianidae are a family of terrestrial birds. In general, they are plump (although they vary in size) and have broad, relatively short wings.

Painted francolin, வர்ண  கௌதாகௌதாரி
Grey francolin, கௌதாரி
Common quail காகாடை
Rain quail, கருங்காடை
King quail
Jungle bush quail, புதர் காகாடை
Rock bush quail, மலைக்காடை
Painted bush quail, வர்ண காகாடை
Red spurfowl, சுண்டங் கோழி
Painted spurfowl, varna sundan kozhi
Grey junglefowl, காட்டு கோழி
Indian peafowl, நீல மயில்

Frogmouths
Order: CaprimulgiformesFamily: Podargidae

The frogmouths are a group of nocturnal birds related to the nightjars. They are named for their large flattened hooked bill and huge frog-like gape, which they use to take insects.

Sri Lanka frogmouth

Nightjars

Order: CaprimulgiformesFamily: Caprimulgidae

Nightjars are medium-sized nocturnal birds that usually nest on the ground. They have long wings, short legs and very short bills. Most have small feet, of little use for walking, and long pointed wings. Their soft plumage is camouflaged to resemble bark or leaves.

Great eared nightjar
Jungle nightjar, காட்டுப் பக்கி
Jerdon's nightjar, நீண்டவால் பக்கி
Indian nightjar, சின்ன பக்கி
Savanna nightjar

Treeswifts
Order: ApodiformesFamily: Hemiprocnidae

The treeswifts, or crested swifts, are closely related to the true swifts. They differ from the other swifts in that they have crests, long forked tails and softer plumage.

Crested treeswift, kondai uzhavaran

Swifts
Order: ApodiformesFamily: Apodidae

Swifts are small birds which spend the majority of their lives flying. These birds have very short legs and never settle voluntarily on the ground, perching instead only on vertical surfaces. Many swifts have long swept-back wings which resemble a crescent or boomerang.

Indian swiftlet
White-rumped spinetail
White-throated needletail
Brown-backed needletail
Asian palm swift, panai uzhavaran
Alpine swift, malai uzhavaran
Common swift
Blyth's swift
Little swift
House swift, nattu uzhavaran

Bustards
Order: OtidiformesFamily: Otididae

Bustards are large terrestrial birds mainly associated with dry open country and steppes in the Old World. They are omnivorous and nest on the ground. They walk steadily on strong legs and big toes, pecking for food as they go. They have long broad wings with "fingered" wingtips and striking patterns in flight. Many have interesting mating displays.

Great Indian bustard
Lesser florican, varagu kozhi

Cuckoos

Order: CuculiformesFamily: Cuculidae

The family Cuculidae includes cuckoos, roadrunners and anis. These birds are of variable size with slender bodies, long tails and strong legs. Many are brood parasites.

Greater coucal, shenbagam
Lesser coucal
Sirkeer malkoha, chevvaayan
Blue-faced malkoha, pachai vayan
Chestnut-winged cuckoo
Jacobin cuckoo, sudalai kuyil
Asian koel, kokilam
Asian emerald cuckoo
Banded bay cuckoo, senkkuyil
Plaintive cuckoo, ' kuyilGrey-bellied cuckoo
Square-tailed drongo-cuckoo
Fork-tailed drongo-cuckoo
Large hawk-cuckoo
Common hawk-cuckoo, akka kuyilHodgson's hawk-cuckoo
Lesser cuckoo
Indian cuckoo, kuyilCommon cuckoo

Sandgrouse

Order: PterocliformesFamily: Pteroclidae

Sandgrouse have small, pigeon like heads and necks, but sturdy compact bodies. They have long pointed wings and sometimes tails and a fast direct flight. Flocks fly to watering holes at dawn and dusk. Their legs are feathered down to the toes.

Chestnut-bellied sandgrouse, kal kowdhariPainted sandgrouse, varna kowdhariPigeons and doves

Order: ColumbiformesFamily: Columbidae

Pigeons and doves are stout-bodied birds with short necks and short slender bills with a fleshy cere.

Rock dove
Nilgiri wood pigeon, nilagiri kattu puraOriental turtle dove
Eurasian collared dove, kalli puraRed collared dove, thavittu puraSpotted dove, pulli puraLaughing dove
Common emerald dove, pancha varna puraOrange-breasted green pigeon
Grey-fronted green pigeon, சாம்பல் நேற்றிப் புறா
Yellow-footed green pigeon, pachai puraGreen imperial pigeon, peria pachai puraMountain imperial pigeon, mandhi puraRails, crakes, and coots

Order: GruiformesFamily: Rallidae

Rallidae is a large family of small to medium-sized birds which includes the rails, crakes, coots and gallinules. Typically they inhabit dense vegetation in damp environments near lakes, swamps or rivers. In general they are shy and secretive birds, making them difficult to observe. Most species have strong legs and long toes which are well adapted to soft uneven surfaces. They tend to have short, rounded wings and to be weak fliers.

Slaty-breasted rail, neela maarbu sambang kozhiCommon moorhen, thaazhai kozhiEurasian coot, naamak kozhiGrey-headed swamphen, neela thazhai kozhiRuddy-breasted crake, sivappu kaanaan kozhiBrown crake
Baillon's crake
Little crake, chinna kaanaan kozhiSlaty-legged crake, kaanan kozhiWatercock, thanneer kozhiWhite-breasted waterhen, kambul kozhiGrebes

Order: PodicipediformesFamily: Podicipedidae

Grebes are small to medium-large freshwater diving birds. They have lobed toes and are excellent swimmers and divers. However, they have their feet placed far back on the body, making them quite ungainly on land.

Little grebe, முக்குளிப்பான்Great crested grebe, பெருங்கொண்டை முக்குளிப்பான் 
Black-necked grebe, கருந்தொண்டை முக்குளிப்பான்Flamingos
Order: PhoenicopteriformesFamily: Phoenicopteridae

Flamingos filter-feed on shellfish and algae. Their oddly shaped beaks are specially adapted to separate mud and silt from the food they consume and, uniquely, are used upside-down.

Greater flamingo, பெரிய பூநாரை
Lesser flamingo, சிறிய பூநாரை (A)

Buttonquail
Order: CharadriiformesFamily: Turnicidae

The buttonquail are small, drab, running birds which resemble the true quails. The female is the brighter of the sexes and initiates courtship. The male incubates the eggs and tends the young.

Common buttonquail, kurung kaadaiYellow-legged buttonquail, manjalkaal kaadaiBarred buttonquail

Stone-curlews and thick-knees
Order: CharadriiformesFamily: Burhinidae

The thick-knees are a group of largely tropical waders in the family Burhinidae. They are found worldwide within the tropical zone, with some species also breeding in temperate Europe and Australia. They are medium to large waders with strong black or yellow-black bills, large yellow eyes and cryptic plumage. Despite being classed as waders, most species have a preference for arid or semi-arid habitats.

Indian stone-curlew, kankilediGreat stone-curlew

Oystercatchers
Order: CharadriiformesFamily: Haematopodidae

The oystercatchers are large and noisy plover-like birds, with strong bills used for smashing or prising open molluscs.

Eurasian oystercatcher

Stilts and avocets

Order: CharadriiformesFamily: Recurvirostridae

Recurvirostridae is a family of large wading birds, which includes the avocets and stilts. The avocets have long legs and long up-curved bills. The stilts have extremely long legs and long, thin, straight bills.

Black-winged stilt, nedungaal ullanPied avocet, konamookku ullanPlovers
Order: CharadriiformesFamily: Charadriidae

The family Charadriidae includes the plovers, dotterels and lapwings. They are small to medium-sized birds with compact bodies, short, thick necks and long, usually pointed, wings. They are found in open country worldwide, mostly in habitats near water.

Yellow-wattled lapwing, manjal mookku aalkattiGrey-headed lapwing
Red-wattled lapwing, sivappu mookku aalkattiPacific golden plover, kalporukki uppukkothiGrey plover, sambal uppukkothiCommon ringed plover
Little ringed plover, pattani uppukkothiKentish plover, siriya uppukkothiLesser sand plover, manal nira uppukkothiGreater sand plover
Caspian plover

Painted-snipes
Order: CharadriiformesFamily: Rostratulidae

Painted-snipes are short-legged, long-billed birds similar in shape to the true snipes, but more brightly coloured.

Greater painted-snipe, mayil ullanJacanas

Order: CharadriiformesFamily: Jacanidae

The jacanas are a group of tropical waders in the family Jacanidae. They are found throughout the tropics. They are identifiable by their huge feet and claws which enable them to walk on floating vegetation in the shallow lakes that are their preferred habitat.

Pheasant-tailed jacana, neela vaal ilai kozhiBronze-winged jacana, thamarai ilai kozhiSandpipers and snipes

Order: CharadriiformesFamily: Scolopacidae

Scolopacidae is a large diverse family of small to medium-sized shorebirds including the sandpipers, curlews, godwits, shanks, tattlers, woodcocks, snipes, dowitchers and phalaropes. The majority of these species eat small invertebrates picked out of the mud or soil. Variation in length of legs and bills enables multiple species to feed in the same habitat, particularly on the coast, without direct competition for food.

Eurasian whimbrel, ciru kottanEurasian curlew, peria kottanBar-tailed godwit, pattaivaal mookkaan'
Black-tailed godwit, karuvaal mookkaan
Ruddy turnstone, kalthiruppi ullan
Great knot
Red knot (A)
Ruff, pedhai ullan
Broad-billed sandpiper, agandra alagu ullan
Curlew sandpiper, curlew ullan
Temminck's stint, pachai kaal kosu ullan
Long-toed stint
Spoon-billed sandpiper (A)
Red-necked stint
Sanderling
Dunlin
Little stint, kosu ullan
Asian dowitcher
Eurasian woodcock, malai mookkan
Jack snipe, korai ullan
Wood snipe
Pin-tailed snipe
Great snipe (A)
Common snipe, visirivaal ullan
Terek sandpiper, terek ullan
Red-necked phalarope, chengazhuthu ullan
Common sandpiper, ullan
Green sandpiper, aatru ullan
Grey-tailed tattler (A)
Common redshank, pavazha kaali
Marsh sandpiper, chinna pachai kaali
Wood sandpiper, pori ullan
Spotted redshank
Common greenshank, pachai kaali

Crab-plover
Order: CharadriiformesFamily: Dromadidae

The crab-plover is related to the waders. It resembles a plover but with very long grey legs and a strong heavy black bill similar to a tern. It has black-and-white plumage, a long neck, partially webbed feet and a bill designed for eating crabs.

Crab-plover, nandu thinni

Coursers and pratincoles
Order: CharadriiformesFamily: Glareolidae

Glareolidae is a family of wading birds comprising the pratincoles, which have short legs, long pointed wings and long forked tails, and the coursers, which have long legs, short wings and long, pointed bills which curve downwards.

Indian courser, kal kuruvi
Collared pratincole, karuvalaya tholkuruvi
Oriental pratincole
Small pratincole, chinna tholkuruvi

Gulls, terns, and skimmers
Order: CharadriiformesFamily: Laridae

Laridae is a family of both gulls and terns. Gulls are medium to large seabirds including kittiwakes. They are typically grey or white, often with black markings on the head or wings. They have stout, longish bills and webbed feet. Terns are a group of generally medium to large seabirds typically with grey or white plumage, often with black markings on the head. Most terns hunt fish by diving but some pick insects off the surface of fresh water. Terns are generally long-lived birds, with several species known to live in excess of 30 years.

Brown noddy
Lesser noddy
Indian skimmer
Slender-billed gull (A)
Brown-headed gull, pazhuppu thalai kadal kakkai
Black-headed gull, karunthalai kadal kakkai
Pallas's gull
Sooty gull (A)
Lesser black-backed gull
Gull-billed tern, parutha alagu aala
Caspian tern
Greater crested tern
Lesser crested tern, kondai aala
Sandwich tern
Little tern
Saunders's tern
Bridled tern
Sooty tern
River tern, aatru aala
Roseate tern
Common tern, aala
Black-bellied tern, karuppu vayitru aala
Whiskered tern, meesai aala
White-winged tern (A)

Skuas
Order: CharadriiformesFamily: Stercorariidae

The family Stercorariidae are, in general, medium to large birds, typically with grey or brown plumage, often with white markings on the wings. They nest on the ground in temperate and arctic regions and are long-distance migrants.

South polar skua (A)
Brown skua (A)
Pomarine jaeger
Parasitic jaeger
Long-tailed jaeger (A)

Tropicbirds
Order: PhaethontiformesFamily: Phaethontidae

Tropicbirds are slender white birds of tropical oceans, with exceptionally long central tail feathers. Their heads and long wings have black markings.

White-tailed tropicbird

Austral storm petrels
Order: ProcellariiformesFamily: Oceanitidae

The austral storm petrels are relatives of the petrels and are the smallest seabirds. They feed on planktonic crustaceans and small fish picked from the surface, typically while hovering. The flight is fluttering and sometimes bat-like.

Wilson's storm petrel

Northern storm petrels
Order: ProcellariiformesFamily: Hydrobatidae

The northern storm petrels are relatives of the petrels and are the smallest seabirds. They feed on planktonic crustaceans and small fish picked from the surface, typically while hovering. The flight is fluttering and sometimes bat-like.

Swinhoe's storm petrel

Petrels, shearwaters, and diving petrels
Order: ProcellariiformesFamily: Procellariidae

The procellariids are the main group of medium-sized "true petrels", characterised by united nostrils with medium septum and a long outer functional primary.

Streaked shearwater
Wedge-tailed shearwater
Flesh-footed shearwater
Tropical shearwater

Storks

Order: CiconiiformesFamily: Ciconiidae

Storks are large, long-legged, long-necked, wading birds with long, stout bills. Storks are mute, but bill-clattering is an important mode of communication at the nest. Their nests can be large and may be reused for many years. Many species are migratory.

Painted stork, சங்குவளை நாரை (அ) மஞ்சள் மூக்கு நாரை
Asian openbill, நத்தைக்குத்தி நாரை
Black stork, கரு நாரை
Woolly-necked stork, வெண்கழுத்து நாரை
White stork, செங்கால் நாரை
Black-necked stork 
Lesser adjutant, சிறிய போதா நாரை (A)
Greater adjutant (A)

Frigatebirds
Order: SuliformesFamily: Fregatidae

Frigatebirds are large seabirds usually found over tropical oceans. They are large, black-and-white or completely black, with long wings and deeply forked tails. The males have coloured inflatable throat pouches. They do not swim or walk and cannot take off from a flat surface. Having the largest wingspan-to-body-weight ratio of any bird, they are essentially aerial, able to stay aloft for more than a week.

Christmas frigatebird, Fregata andrewsi (A)
Great frigatebird, Fregata minor (A)
Lesser frigatebird, Fregata ariel

Anhingas and darters
Order: SuliformesFamily: Anhingidae

Anhingas or darters are often called "snake-birds" because of their long thin neck, which gives a snake-like appearance when they swim with their bodies submerged. The males have black and dark-brown plumage, an erectile crest on the nape and a larger bill than the female. The females have much paler plumage especially on the neck and underparts. The darters have completely webbed feet and their legs are short and set far back on the body. Their plumage is somewhat permeable, like that of cormorants, and they spread their wings to dry after diving.

Oriental darter, பாம்புத்தாரா

Cormorants and shags
Order: SuliformesFamily: Phalacrocoracidae

Phalacrocoracidae is a family of medium to large coastal, fish-eating seabirds that includes cormorants and shags. Plumage colouration varies, with the majority having mainly dark plumage, some species being black-and-white and a few being colourful.

Little cormorant, சிறிய நீர்க்காகம்
Indian cormorant, இந்திய நீர்க்காகம்
Great cormorant, பெரிய நீர்க்காகம்

Ibises and spoonbills

Order: PelecaniformesFamily: Threskiornithidae

Threskiornithidae is a family of large terrestrial and wading birds which includes the ibises and spoonbills. They have long, broad wings with 11 primary and about 20 secondary feathers. They are strong fliers and despite their size and weight, very capable soarers.

Black-headed ibis, கருந்தலை அன்றில்
Red-naped ibis
Glossy ibis, சின்ன அன்றில் 
Eurasian spoonbill, கரண்டிவாயன்

Herons and bitterns

Order: PelecaniformesFamily: Ardeidae

The family Ardeidae contains the bitterns, herons and egrets. Herons and egrets are medium to large wading birds with long necks and legs. Bitterns tend to be shorter necked and more wary. Members of Ardeidae fly with their necks retracted, unlike other long-necked birds such as storks, ibises and spoonbills.

Eurasian bittern
Little bittern
Yellow bittern, மஞ்சள் குருகு
Cinnamon bittern
Black bittern, கருங்குருகு
Malayan night heron
Black-crowned night heron, இராக்கொக்கு (அ) வக்கா
Striated heron, சின்ன பச்சைக் கொக்கு
Indian pond heron, குளத்துக் கொக்கு
Chinese pond heron
Eastern cattle egret, உண்ணிக் கொக்கு
Grey heron, சாம்பல் கொக்கு
Purple heron, செந்நீலக் கொக்கு
Great egret, பெரிய கொக்கு
Intermediate egret, நடுவாந்திரக் கொக்கு
Little egret, சின்ன கொக்கு
Western reef heron, கரைக் கொக்கு
Pacific reef heron

Pelicans

Order: PelecaniformesFamily: Pelecanidae

Pelicans are large water birds with a distinctive pouch under their beak. As with other members of the order Pelecaniformes, they have webbed feet with four toes.

Great white pelican
Spot-billed pelican, சாம்பல் கூழைக்கடா

Osprey
Order: AccipitriformesFamily: Pandionidae

The family Pandionidae contains usually only one species, the osprey. The osprey is a medium-large raptor which is a specialist fish-eater.

Osprey, விராலடிப்பான்

Kites, hawks, and eagles

Order: AccipitriformesFamily: Accipitridae

Accipitridae is a family of birds of prey, which includes hawks, eagles, kites, harriers and Old World vultures. These birds have powerful hooked beaks for tearing flesh from their prey, strong legs, powerful talons and keen eyesight.

Black-winged kite, மொசலடி
Egyptian vulture, மஞ்சள்முக பாறுக்கழுகு
European honey buzzard (A)
Crested honey buzzard, தேன் பருந்து
Jerdon's baza, கொண்டை வல்லூறு
Black baza, கரும் கொண்டை வல்லூறு
White-rumped vulture, வெண்முதுகுப் பாறுக்கழுகு
Indian vulture, இந்தியப் பாறுக்கழுகு
Griffon vulture
Red-headed vulture, செந்தலை பாறுக்கழுகு
Cinereous vulture
Crested serpent eagle, காட்டுப் பாம்புக்கழுகு
Short-toed snake eagle, ஓணான் கொத்திக் கழுகு
Changeable hawk-eagle, குடுமிக்கழுகு
Legge's hawk-eagle
Rufous-bellied eagle, செவ்வயிற்றுக் கழுகு
Black eagle, கருங்கழுகு
Indian spotted eagle
Greater spotted eagle, pulli parundhu
Booted eagle, வெண்தோள் கழுகு
Tawny eagle, aaalipparundhu
Steppe eagle
Eastern imperial eagle
Bonelli's eagle, இராசாளிக் கழுகு
Crested goshawk, குடுமி வல்லூறு
Shikra, வல்லூறு
Besra, chinna valluru
Eurasian sparrowhawk
Northern goshawk
Western marsh harrier, சதுப்புநில பூனைப்பருந்து
Eastern marsh harrier (A)
Pallid harrier, வெள்ளை பூனைப்பருந்து
Pied harrier, கருப்பு வெள்ளை பூனைப்பருந்து
Montagu's harrier, மாண்டேகு பூனைப்பருந்து
Black kite, கரும்பருந்து
Brahminy kite, செம்பருந்து
White-bellied sea eagle, வெள்ளை ஆழிக்கழுகு
Lesser fish eagle, சிறிய மீன்பிடி கழுகு 
Grey-headed fish eagle
White-eyed buzzard, வெள்ளைக்கண் பருந்து (அ) வெள்ளைக்கண் வைரி
Long-legged buzzard
Common buzzard

Barn owls
Order: StrigiformesFamily: Tytonidae

Barn owls are medium to large owls with large heads and characteristic heart-shaped faces. They have long strong legs with powerful talons.

Eastern barn owl, koogai andhai
Eastern grass owl
Sri Lanka bay owl

Owls
Order: StrigiformesFamily: Strigidae

The typical owls are small to large solitary nocturnal birds of prey. They have large forward-facing eyes and ears, a hawk-like beak and a conspicuous circle of feathers around each eye called a facial disk.

Indian scops owl
Oriental scops owl
Eurasian eagle owl
Indian eagle owl, komban aandhai / kottaan
Spot-bellied eagle owl
Dusky eagle owl
Brown fish owl, poomar aandhai
Mottled wood owl, pooripulli aandhai
Brown wood owl
Jungle owlet, chinna kattu aandhai
Spotted owlet, pulli aandhai
Brown boobook, vettaikara aandhai
Long-eared owl
Short-eared owl, kuttai kaadhu aandhai

Trogons

Order: TrogoniformesFamily: Trogonidae

The family Trogonidae includes trogons and quetzals. Found in tropical woodlands worldwide, they feed on insects and fruit, and their broad bills and weak legs reflect their diet and arboreal habits. Although their flight is fast, they are reluctant to fly any distance. Trogons have soft, often colourful, feathers with distinctive male and female plumage.

Malabar trogon, theekakkai

Hoopoes
Order: BucerotiformesFamily: Upupidae

Hoopoes have black, white and orangey-pink colouring with a large erectile crest on their head.

Eurasian hoopoe, kondalathi

Hornbills

Order: BucerotiformesFamily: Bucerotidae

Hornbills are a group of birds whose bill is shaped like a cow's horn, but without a twist, sometimes with a casque on the upper mandible. Frequently, the bill is brightly coloured.

Great hornbill, பெரிய இருவாசி
Malabar pied hornbill, karuppu vellai iruvaayan
Malabar grey hornbill, ottrai iruvaayan
Indian grey hornbill, saambal iruvaayan

Rollers
Order: CoraciiformesFamily: Coraciidae

Rollers resemble crows in size and build, but are more closely related to the kingfishers and bee-eaters. They share the colourful appearance of those groups with blues and browns predominating. The two inner front toes are connected, but the outer toe is not.

Indian roller, panangadai
European roller (A)
Oriental dollarbird

Kingfishers
Order: CoraciiformesFamily: Alcedinidae

Kingfishers are medium-sized birds with large heads, long, pointed bills, short legs and stubby tails.

Stork-billed kingfisher, peria alagu meenkothi
White-throated kingfisher, venthondai meenkothi
Black-capped kingfisher, karunthalai meenkothi
Collared kingfisher
Blue-eared kingfisher
Common kingfisher
Oriental dwarf kingfisher, chinna meenkothi
Pied kingfisher, karuppu vellai meenkothi

Bee-eaters

Order: CoraciiformesFamily: Meropidae

The bee-eaters are a group of near passerine birds in the family Meropidae. Most species are found in Africa but others occur in southern Europe, Madagascar, Australia and New Guinea. They are characterised by richly coloured plumage, slender bodies and usually elongated central tail feathers. All are colourful and have long downturned bills and pointed wings, which give them a swallow-like appearance when seen from afar.

Blue-bearded bee-eater, காட்டுப் பஞ்சுருட்டான்
Asian green bee-eater, பச்சைப் பஞ்சுருட்டான்
Blue-cheeked bee-eater
Blue-tailed bee-eater, நீலவால் பஞ்சுருட்டான்
Chestnut-headed bee-eater, செந்தலைப் பஞ்சுருட்டான்
European bee-eater, ஐரோப்பியப் பஞ்சுருட்டான்

Asian barbets
Order: PiciformesFamily: Megalaimidae

The Asian barbets are plump birds, with short necks and large heads. They get their name from the bristles which fringe their heavy bills. Most species are brightly coloured.

Brown-headed barbet, kattu pachai kukkuruvaan
White-cheeked barbet, chinna kukkuruvaan
Malabar barbet
Coppersmith barbet, chemmarbu kukkuruvaan

Woodpeckers

Order: PiciformesFamily: Picidae

Woodpeckers are small to medium-sized birds with chisel-like beaks, short legs, stiff tails and long tongues used for capturing insects. Some species have feet with two toes pointing forward and two backward, while several species have only three toes. Many woodpeckers have the habit of tapping noisily on tree trunks with their beaks.

Eurasian wryneck
Speckled piculet, pulli maram kothi
Heart-spotted woodpecker, karumpulli maram kothi
Brown-capped pygmy woodpecker, sinna maram kothi
Yellow-crowned woodpecker, manjal netri maram kothi
White-bellied woodpecker, பெரிய கருப்பு மரங்கோத்தி
Lesser yellownape, manjal pidari maram kothi
Streak-throated woodpecker, sethil vayitru maram kothi
Himalayan flameback (I)
Common flameback
Black-rumped flameback
Greater flameback, peria ponmudhugu maram kothi
White-naped woodpecker
Rufous woodpecker, karum sivappu maram kothi

Caracaras and falcons
Order: FalconiformesFamily: Falconidae

Falconidae is a family of diurnal birds of prey. They differ from hawks, eagles and kites in that they kill with their beaks instead of their talons.

Lesser kestrel
Common kestrel, sivappu vallooru
Red-necked falcon, senthalai vallooru
Amur falcon, falco amurensis
Eurasian hobby
Oriental hobby
Laggar falcon
Peregrine falcon, pori vallooru

Old World parrots
Order: PsittaciformesFamily: Psittaculidae

Characteristic features of parrots include a strong curved bill, an upright stance, strong legs, and clawed zygodactyl feet. Many parrots are vividly coloured, and some are multi-coloured. Old World parrots are found from Africa east across south and southeast Asia and Oceania to Australia and New Zealand.

Blossom-headed parakeet
Plum-headed parakeet, செந்தலைக் கிளி
Blue-winged parakeet, சோலைக்கிளி
Alexandrine parakeet, பெரிய பச்சைக்கிளி
Rose-ringed parakeet, பச்சைக்கிளி
Vernal hanging parrot, சின்னக்கிளி

Pittas
Order: PasseriformesFamily: Pittidae

Pittas are medium-sized by passerine standards and are stocky, with fairly long, strong legs, short tails and stout bills. Many are brightly coloured. They spend the majority of their time on wet forest floors, eating snails, insects and similar invertebrates.

Indian pitta, thottakkallan

Vangas, helmetshrikes, woodshrikes, and shrike-flycatchers
Order: PasseriformesFamily: Vangidae

The woodshrikes are similar in build to the shrikes.

Bar-winged flycatcher-shrike, hemipus picatus, karuppu vellai keechaan
Malabar woodshrike
Common woodshrike, kattu keechaan

Woodswallows, butcherbirds, and peltops
Order: PasseriformesFamily: Artamidae

The woodswallows are soft-plumaged, somber-coloured passerine birds. They are smooth, agile flyers with moderately large, semi-triangular wings.

Ashy woodswallow, sambal thangaivilaan

Ioras
Order: PasseriformesFamily: Aegithinidae

The ioras are bulbul-like birds of open forest or thorn scrub, but whereas that group tends to be drab in colouration, ioras are sexually dimorphic, with the males being brightly plumaged in yellows and greens.

Common iora, manja chittu
Marshall's iora

Cuckooshrikes
Order: PasseriformesFamily: Campephagidae

The cuckooshrikes are small to medium-sized passerine birds. They are predominantly greyish with white and black, although some species are brightly coloured.

White-bellied minivet
Small minivet, chinna min chittu
Orange minivet, min chittu,
Ashy minivet
Swinhoe's minivet (A)
Large cuckooshrike, kuyil keechaan
Pied triller (A)
Black-winged cuckooshrike
Black-headed cuckooshrike, karunthalai kuyil keechaan

Shrikes
Order: PasseriformesFamily: Laniidae

Shrikes are passerine birds known for their habit of catching other birds and small animals and impaling the uneaten portions of their bodies on thorns. A typical shrike's beak is hooked, like a bird of prey.

Brown shrike, pazhuppu keechaan
Isabelline shrike
Bay-backed shrike, karunchivappu mudhugu keechaan
Long-tailed shrike, chemmudhugu keechaan
Great grey shrike

Figbirds, orioles, and turnagra
Order: PasseriformesFamily: Oriolidae

The Old World orioles are colourful passerine birds. They are not related to the New World orioles.

Black-hooded oriole
Indian golden oriole, maangkuil
Black-naped oriole

Drongos
Order: PasseriformesFamily: Dicruridae

The drongos are mostly black or dark grey in colour, sometimes with metallic tints. They have long forked tails, and some Asian species have elaborate tail decorations. They have short legs and sit very upright when perched, like a shrike. They flycatch or take prey from the ground.

Bronzed drongo, karumpachai karichaan
Greater racket-tailed drongo, thuduppu vaal karichaan
Hair-crested drongo
Ashy drongo, karichaan
White-bellied drongo, vellai vayitru karichaan
Black drongo, karung karichaan

Fantails and silktails
Order: PasseriformesFamily: Rhipiduridae

The fantails are small insectivorous birds which are specialist aerial feeders.

White-throated fantail, venthondai visirival eeppidippan
White-spotted fantail
White-browed fantail, venpuruva visirivall eeppidippan

Monarchs

Order: PasseriformesFamily: Monarchidae

The monarch flycatchers are small to medium-sized insectivorous passerines which hunt by flycatching.

Black-naped monarch, karumpidari neela eeppidippan
Indian paradise flycatcher, arasawal eppidippan

Crows and jays

Order: PasseriformesFamily: Corvidae

The family Corvidae includes crows, ravens, jays, choughs, magpies, treepies, nutcrackers and ground jays. Corvids are above average in size among the Passeriformes, and some of the larger species show high levels of intelligence.

Rufous treepie
Grey treepie
White-bellied treepie, vellai vayitru vaal kaakkai
House crow, kakkai
Large-billed crow
Eastern jungle crow
Indian jungle crow

Fairy flycatchers
Order: PasseriformesFamily: Stenostiridae

Most of the species of this small family are found in Africa, though a few inhabit tropical Asia. They are not closely related to other birds called "flycatchers".

Grey-headed canary-flycatcher, sambal thalai eeppidippan

Tits and chickadees
Order: PasseriformesFamily: Paridae

The Paridae are mainly small stocky woodland species with short stout bills. Some have crests. They are adaptable birds, with a mixed diet including seeds and insects.

Cinereous tit, pattani kuruvi
White-naped tit
Indian black-lored tit
Yellow-cheeked tit

Larks
Order: PasseriformesFamily: Alaudidae

Larks are small terrestrial birds with often extravagant songs and display flights. Most larks are fairly dull in appearance. Their food is insects and seeds.

Rufous-tailed lark, sigappuvaal vanambai
Ashy-crowned sparrow-lark, sambalthalai vaanambadi
Singing bush lark
Indian bush lark, sivappu irakkai vaanambadi
Jerdon's bush lark, pudhar vaanambadi
Oriental skylark, chinna vaanambadi
Eurasian skylark
Sykes's lark
Malabar lark
Mongolian short-toed lark
Greater short-toed lark

Bulbuls

Order: PasseriformesFamily: Pycnonotidae

Bulbuls are medium-sized songbirds. Some are colourful with yellow, red or orange vents, cheeks, throats or supercilia, but most are drab, with uniform olive-brown to black plumage.

White-throated bulbul, venpuruva chinnaan
Yellow-browed bulbul, manjal puruva chinnaan
Black bulbul
Square-tailed bulbul, karuppu chinnaan
Grey-headed bulbul, sambalthaalai chinnaan
Flame-throated bulbul
White-browed bulbul, venpuruva chinnaan
Yellow-throated bulbul, manjal thondai chinnaan
Red-whiskered bulbul, sivappu meesai chinnaan
Red-vented bulbul, chinnaan

Swallows and martins
Order: PasseriformesFamily: Hirundinidae

The family Hirundinidae is adapted to aerial feeding. They have a slender streamlined body, long pointed wings and a short bill with a wide gape. The feet are adapted to perching rather than walking, and the front toes are partially joined at the base.

Sand martin
Barn swallow, thagaivilaan
Pacific swallow, nattu thagaivilaan
Hill swallow
Wire-tailed swallow, kambiwall thagaivilaan
Eurasian crag martin
Dusky crag martin, paarai thagaivilaan
Common house martin
Red-rumped swallow, sivappu pitta thagaivilaan
Streak-throated swallow, chinna thagaivilaan

Leaf warblers & allies
Order: PasseriformesFamily: Phylloscopidae

Leaf warblers are a family of small insectivorous birds found mostly in Eurasia and ranging into Wallacea and Africa. The species are of various sizes, often green-plumaged above and yellow below, or more subdued with grayish-green to grayish-brown colors.

Hume's leaf warbler
Yellow-browed warbler
Tytler's leaf warbler
Sulphur-bellied warbler
Tickell's leaf warbler
Dusky warbler
Mountain chiffchaff
Common chiffchaff
Green warbler
Greenish warbler, pachai kadhirkuruvi
Large-billed leaf warbler
Western crowned warbler

Reed warblers, Grauer’s warbler, & allies
Order: PasseriformesFamily: Acrocephalidae

The members of this family are usually rather large for "warblers". Most are rather plain olivaceous brown above with much yellow to beige below. They are usually found in open woodland, reedbeds, or tall grass. The family occurs mostly in southern to western Eurasia and surroundings, but it also ranges far into the Pacific, with some species in Africa.

Clamorous reed warbler, naanal kadhirkuruvi
Paddyfield warbler, vayal kadhirkuruvi
Blyth's reed warbler, blyth naanal kadhirkuruvi
Thick-billed warbler
Booted warbler, mara kadhirkuruvi
Sykes's warbler, Sykes kadhirkuruvi

Grassbirds & allies
Order: PasseriformesFamily: Locustellidae

Locustellidae are a family of small insectivorous songbirds found mainly in Eurasia, Africa, and the Australian region. They are smallish birds with tails that are usually long and pointed, and tend to be drab brownish or buffy all over.

Pallas's grasshopper warbler, Pallas's thathukili kadhirkuruvi
Common grasshopper warbler, thathukili kadhirkuruvi
Broad-tailed grassbird
Bristled grassbird

Cisticolas and allies
Order: PasseriformesFamily: Cisticolidae

The Cisticolidae are warblers found mainly in warmer southern regions of the Old World. They are generally very small birds of drab brown or grey appearance found in open country such as grassland or scrub.

Zitting cisticola, karungottu kadhirkuruvi
Golden-headed cisticola, chenthalai kadhirkuruvi
Grey-breasted prinia, velir sambal kadhirkuruvi
Jungle prinia, kattu kadhirkuruvi
Ashy prinia, saambal kadhirkuruvi
Plain prinia, kadhirkuruvi
Common tailorbird, fhaiyal chittu

Sylviid babblers
Order: PasseriformesFamily: Sylviidae

The family Sylviidae is a group of small insectivorous passerine birds. They mainly occur as breeding species, as the common name implies, in Europe, Asia and, to a lesser extent, Africa. Most are of generally undistinguished appearance, but many have distinctive songs.

Lesser whitethroat
Hume's whitethroat
Eastern Orphean warbler

Parrotbills and allies
Order: PasseriformesFamily: Paradoxornithidae

The parrotbills are a group of peculiar birds native to East and Southeast Asia, though feral populations exist elsewhere. They are generally small, long-tailed birds which inhabit reedbeds and similar habitat. They feed mainly on seeds, e.g. of grasses, to which their bill, as the name implies, is well-adapted.

Yellow-eyed babbler, manjalkan salamban

White-eyes
Order: PasseriformesFamily: Zosteropidae

The white-eyes are small and mostly undistinguished, their plumage above being generally some dull colour like greenish-olive, but some species have a white or bright yellow throat, breast or lower parts, and several have buff flanks. As their name suggests, many species have a white ring around each eye.

Indian white-eye, vellai kanni

Babblers and scimitar babblers
Order: PasseriformesFamily: Timaliidae

The babblers, or timaliids, are somewhat diverse in size and colouration, but are characterised by soft fluffy plumage.

Tawny-bellied babbler, venthondai salamban
Dark-fronted babbler, karunthalai salamban
Pin-striped tit-babbler
Indian scimitar babbler, valaindha alagu salamban

Ground babblers
Order: PasseriformesFamily: Pellorneidae

These small to medium-sized songbirds have soft fluffy plumage but are otherwise rather diverse. Members of the genus Illadopsis are found in forests, but some other genera are birds of scrublands

Puff-throated babbler

Alcippe fulvettas
Order: PasseriformesFamily: Alcippeidae

The genus once included many other fulvettas and was previously placed in families Pellorneidae or Timaliidae.

Brown-cheeked fulvetta, kalakalappan salamban

Laughingthrushes & allies

Order: PasseriformesFamily: Leiothrichidae

The members of this family are diverse in size and colouration, though those of genus Turdoides tend to be brown or greyish. The family is found in Africa, India, and southeast Asia.

Nilgiri laughingthrush, nilagiri chirippan
Palani laughingthrush
Ashambu laughingthrush
Large grey babbler, peria sambal salamban
Rufous babbler, karunchivappu salamban
Jungle babbler, kattu salamban
Yellow-billed babblerventhalai salamban
Common babbler, thavittu salamban
Wayanad laughingthrush, wayanattu chirippan

Fairy-bluebirds
Order: PasseriformesFamily: Irenidae

The fairy-bluebirds are bulbul-like birds of open forest or thorn scrub. The males are dark-blue and the females a duller green.

Asian fairy bluebird, neelachittu

Nuthatches
Order: PasseriformesFamily: Sittidae

Nuthatches are small woodland birds. They have the unusual ability to climb down trees head first, unlike other birds which can only go upwards. Nuthatches have big heads, short tails and powerful bills and feet.

Velvet-fronted nuthatch, velvet netri pasaiyeduppan
Indian nuthatch
Chestnut-bellied nuthatch, sembazhuppu vayitru pasaiyeduppan

Treecreepers
Order: PasseriformesFamily: Certhiidae

Treecreepers are small woodland birds, brown above and white below. They have thin pointed down-curved bills, which they use to extricate insects from bark. They have stiff tail feathers, like woodpeckers, which they use to support themselves on vertical trees.

Indian spotted creeper

Starlings and rhabdornis

Order: PasseriformesFamily: Sturnidae

Starlings are small to medium-sized passerine birds. Their flight is strong and direct and they are very gregarious. Their preferred habitat is fairly open country. They eat insects and fruit. Plumage is typically dark with a metallic sheen.

Common hill myna
Southern hill myna, மலை நாகணவாய்
Jungle myna, காட்டு நாகணவாய்
Bank myna
Common myna, நாகணவாய்
Pied myna
Daurian starling
Chestnut-tailed starling, சாம்பல் தலை நாகணவாய்
Malabar starling
Brahminy starling, கருங்கொண்டை நாகணவாய்
Rosy starling, சோளக்குருவி

Thrushes
Order: PasseriformesFamily: Turdidae

The thrushes are a group of passerine birds that occur mainly in the Old World. They are plump, soft plumaged, small to medium-sized insectivores or sometimes omnivores, often feeding on the ground. Many have attractive songs.

Pied thrush
Orange-headed thrush, senthalai poong kuruvi
Scaly thrush, nilagiri poong kuruvi
Nilgiri thrush
Tickell's thrush
Indian blackbird
Eyebrowed thrush

Chats and Old World flycatchers

Order: PasseriformesFamily: Muscicapidae

Chats and Old World flycatchers is a large group of small passerine birds native to the Old World. They are mainly small arboreal insectivores. The appearance of these birds is highly varied, but they mostly have weak songs and harsh calls.

Indian robin, karunchittu
Oriental magpie-robin, karuppu vellai kuruvi
White-rumped shama, isaipaadum shama
White-crowned shama
Spotted flycatcher
Dark-sided flycatcher
Asian brown flycatcher
Brown-breasted flycatcher, pazhuppu marbu eeppidippan
White-bellied blue flycatcher, vellai vayitru neela eeppidippan
Tickell's blue flycatcher, ticklell neela eeppidippan
Blue-throated blue flycatcher
Blue-and-white flycatcher (A)
Verditer flycatcher
Nilgiri flycatcher, nilagiri eeppidippan
Indian blue robin
Bluethroat, neelakantan
Siberian rubythroat
Nilgiri blue robin
White-bellied blue robin
Malabar whistling thrush, seegaar poong kuruvi
Ultramarine flycatcher
Rusty-tailed flycatcher
Taiga flycatcher
Red-breasted flycatcher (A)
Kashmir flycatcher
Black-and-orange flycatcher, karuppu orange eeppidippan
Black redstart
Blue rock thrush, neela poong kuruvi
Blue-capped rock thrush, neelthalai poong kuruvi
Siberian stonechat
Pied bush chat
Isabelline wheatear
Desert wheatear

Leafbirds
Order: PasseriformesFamily: Chloropseidae

The leafbirds are small, bulbul-like birds. The males are brightly plumaged, usually in greens and yellows.

Jerdon's leafbird
Golden-fronted leafbird

Flowerpeckers
Order: PasseriformesFamily: Dicaeidae

The flowerpeckers are very small, stout, often brightly coloured birds, with short tails, short thick curved bills and tubular tongues.

Thick-billed flowerpecker, parutha alagu malar kothi
Pale-billed flowerpecker
Nilgiri flowerpecker)
Plain flowerpecker

Sunbirds

Order: PasseriformesFamily: Nectariniidae

The sunbirds and spiderhunters are very small passerine birds which feed largely on nectar, although they will also take insects, especially when feeding young. Flight is fast and direct on their short wings. Most species can take nectar by hovering like a hummingbird, but usually perch to feed.

Purple-rumped sunbird, oodha pitta thenchittu
Crimson-backed sunbird
Purple sunbird, oodha thenchittu
Loten's sunbird, lotun thenchittu
Little spiderhunter, chinna silanthi pidippan

Old World sparrows and snowfinches
Order: PasseriformesFamily: Passeridae

Sparrows are small passerine birds. In general, sparrows tend to be small, plump, brown or grey birds with short tails and short powerful beaks. Sparrows are seed eaters, but they also consume small insects.

House sparrow, சிட்டுக்குருவி
Yellow-throated sparrow, மஞ்சள் தொண்டைக் குருவி

Weavers and widowbirds

Order: PasseriformesFamily: Ploceidae

The weavers are small passerine birds related to the finches. They are seed-eating birds with rounded conical bills. The males of many species are brightly coloured, usually in red or yellow and black, some species show variation in colour only in the breeding season.

Black-breasted weaver
Streaked weaver, karungeetru thookkanam
Baya weaver, tookanag kuruvi

Waxbills, munias, and allies

Order: PasseriformesFamily: Estrildidae

The estrildid finches are small passerine birds of the Old World tropics and Australasia. They are gregarious and often colonial seed eaters with short thick but pointed bills. They are all similar in structure and habits, but have wide variation in plumage colours and patterns.

Indian silverbill
Scaly-breasted munia, புள்ளிச் சில்லை
Black-throated munia, கருந்தொண்டை சில்லை
White-rumped munia, வெண்முதுகு சில்லை
Tricoloured munia, திணைக்குருவி
Green avadavat
Red avadavat

Wagtails and pipits
Order: PasseriformesFamily: Motacillidae

Motacillidae is a family of small passerine birds with medium to long tails. They include the wagtails, longclaws and pipits. They are slender, ground feeding insectivores of open country

Forest wagtail, கொடிக்கால் வாலாட்டிக்குருவி
Western yellow wagtail
Citrine wagtail, மஞ்சள்  தலை வாலாட்டிக்குருவி
Grey wagtail, கரும் சாம்பல் வாலாட்டிக்குருவி
White wagtail, வெள்ளை வாலாட்டிக்குருவி 
White-browed wagtail
Richard's pipit, ரிச்சர்ட் நெட்டைக்காலி
Paddyfield pipit, வயல் நெட்டைக்காலி 
Blyth's pipit
Tawny pipit
Long-billed pipit
Tree pipit
Olive-backed pipit
Nilgiri pipit, நீலகிரி நெட்டைக்காலி

Finches and euphonias
Order: PasseriformesFamily: Fringillidae

Finches are seed-eating passerine birds, that are small to moderately large and have a strong beak, usually conical and in some species very large. All have twelve tail feathers and nine primaries. These birds have a bouncing flight with alternating bouts of flapping and gliding on closed wings, and most sing well.

Common rosefinch, koombalagan

Buntings
Order: PasseriformesFamily: Emberizidae

The emberizids are a large family of passerine birds. They are seed-eating birds with distinctively shaped bills. In Europe, most species are called buntings. In North America, most of the species in this family are known as sparrows, but these birds are not closely related to the Old World sparrows which are in the family Passeridae. Many emberizid species have distinctive head patterns.

Grey-necked bunting
Black-headed bunting
Red-headed bunting, kattu chenthalayan

See also 
 Wildlife of Tamil Nadu
 Birds of Coimbatore
 Lists of birds by region

Notes

References

Sálim Ali Centre for Ornithology and Natural History, Coimbatore, Annual report, 2006-2007

Tamil Nadu
Fauna of Tamil Nadu